Rosa beggeriana is a species of rose found in Anatolia, Iran, Afghanistan, Pakistan, all of Central Asia, Xinjiang and Gansu in China, and Mongolia. It is a winterhardy rambler, with typically flat white (rarely light pink) flowers, and small red (becoming blackpurple) hips. Its 'Polstjärnan' (polestar) cultivar (of uncertain parentage) is the coldhardiest known climbing rose.

Varieties
Rosa beggeriana is a highly variable species, with numerous infraspecific taxa having been described. The following varieties are currently accepted:
Rosa beggeriana var. beggeriana
Rosa beggeriana var. lioui (T.T.Yu & H.T.Tsai) T.T.Yu & T.C.Ku

References

beggeriana
Plants described in 1841